The structure of the French Army is fixed by Chapter 2 of Title II of Book II of the Third Part of the Code of Defense, notably resulting in the codification of Decree 2000-559 of 21 June 2000.

Army General Staff 
The Army General Staff is headquartered in Paris.

 État-major de l'Armée de terre - Army General Staff, in Paris
 Centre de doctrine et d'enseignement au commandement (CDEC) - Doctrine and Leadership teaching Centre, in Paris
 Section technique de l'Armée de terre (STAT) - Army Technical Section, in Versailles
 Groupement aéromobilité de la section technique de l'Armée de terre (GAMSTAT) - Army Technical Section Airmobile Group, in Chabeuil
 Corps de réaction rapide européen (CRR-E) - French Element European Rapid Reaction Corps (Eurocorps), in Strasbourg

Light Aviation Command 

The Army Light Aviation Command is headquartered in Vélizy-Villacoublay.

 Commandement de l'Aviation légère de l’Armée de terre (COM ALAT) - Army Light Aviation Command, in Vélizy-Villacoublay
 9 Régiment de Soutien Aéromobile (9 RSAM) - 9th Airmobile Support Regiment, in Montauban
 Détachement avions de l'Armée de terre (DAAT) - Army Planes Detachment, in Saint-Jacques-de-la-Lande
 École de l'Aviation légère de l’Armée de terre (EALAT) - Army Light Aviation School, in Le Cannet-des-Maures
 Base École - 2 Régiment d'Hélicoptères de Combat (base école - 2 RHC), School Base - 2nd Combat Helicopter Regiment, in Le Cannet-des-Maures
 Base École - 6 Régiment d'Hélicoptères de Combat (base école - 6 RHC), School Base - 6th Combat Helicopter Regiment, in Dax
 
 
 Centre de formation franco-allemand pour le personnel technico-logistique Tigre (CFA PTL), Franco-German Tiger Logistic Formation Centre in Faßberg (Germany)

4th Air-Combat Brigade 

The 4th Air-Combat Brigade contains all the operational helicopter regiments of the army and is headquartered in Clermont-Ferrand.

 4 Brigade d'Aérocombat (4 BAC) - 4th Air-Combat Brigade, in Clermont-Ferrand
 4 Compagnie de Commandement et de Transmissions (4 CCT) - 4th Command and Signals Company, in Clermont-Ferrand
 1 Régiment d'Hélicoptères de Combat (1 RHC) - 1st Combat Helicopter Regiment, in Phalsbourg
 3 Régiment d'Hélicoptères de Combat (3 RHC) - 3rd Combat Helicopter Regiment, in Étain 
 5 Régiment d'Hélicoptères de Combat (5 RHC) - 5th Combat Helicopter Regiment, in Pau

Army Special Forces Command 

The Army Special Forces Command recruits and trains the army's special forces units and is headquartered in Pau. Operationally the command falls under the Special Operations Command.

 Commandement des Forces Spéciales Terre (COM FST) - Army Special Forces Command, in Pau
 Compagnie de Commandement et de Transmissions des Forces Spéciales (CCTFS) - Special Forces Command and Signals Company, in Pau
 1 Régiment de Parachutistes d'Infanterie de Marine (1 RPIMa) - 1st Marine Infantry Paratroopers Regiment, in Bayonne
 13 Régiment de Dragons Parachutistes (13 RDP) - 13th Paratrooper Dragoons Regiment, in Martignas-sur-Jalle
 4 Régiment d'Hélicoptères des Forces Spéciales (4 RHFS) - 4th Special Forces Helicopter Regiment, in Pau
 Groupement d'Appui aux Opérations Spéciales (GAOS) - Special Operations Support Group, in Pau
 Académie des Forces Spéciales (Académie FS) - Special Forces Academy, in Pau

National Territory Land Command 
The National Territory Land Command is headquartered in Paris and tasked with preparing for and providing support for an eventual operational deployment French Army forces on the French national territory.

 Commandement terre pour le territoire national (COM TN) - National Territory Land Command, in Paris
 Service Militaire Volontaire (SMV) - Voluntary Military Service, in Paris
 1er Régiment du Service Militaire Volontaire (1er RSMV) - 1st Voluntary Military Service Regiment (Flag and traditions of the 2e Régiment du Génie), in Montigny-lès-Metz
 2e Régiment du Service Militaire Volontaire (2e RSMV) - 2nd Voluntary Military Service Regiment (Flag and traditions of the 10e Régiment d'Artillerie de Marine), in Brétigny-sur-Orge
 3e Régiment du Service Militaire Volontaire (3e RSMV) - 3rd Voluntary Military Service Regiment (Flag and traditions of the 57e Régiment d'Infanterie), in La Rochelle
 Détachement du Service Militaire Volontaire (DSMV) - Voluntary Military Service Detachment, in Châlons-en-Champagne
 Service Militaire Adapté (SMA) - Adapted Military Service, in Paris
 Détachement du Service Militaire Adapté (DSMA) - Adapted Military Service Detachment, in Périgueux
 Régiment du Service Militaire Adapté de la Martinique (RSMA-M) - Martinique Adapted Military Service Regiment, in Martinique
 Régiment du Service Militaire Adapté de la Guadeloupe (RSMA-Ga) - Guadeloupe Adapted Military Service Regiment, in Guadeloupe
 Régiment du Service Militaire Adapté de Guyane (RSMA-Gy) - Guiana Adapted Military Service Regiment, in French Guiana
 Régiment du Service Militaire Adapté de La Réunion (RSMA-R) - Réunion Adapted Military Service Regiment, in Réunion
 Régiment du Service Militaire Adapté de Nouvelle-Calédonie (RSMA-NC) - New Caledonia Adapted Military Service Regiment, in New Caledonia
 Régiment du Service Militaire Adapté de Polynésie française (RSMA-PF) - French Polynesia Adapted Military Service Regiment, in French Polynesia
 Bataillon du Service Militaire Adapté de Mayotte (BSMA-Mayotte) - Mayotte Adapted Military Service Battalion, in Mayotte
 Brigade de sapeurs-pompiers de Paris (BSPP) - Paris Fire Brigade, in Paris
 Unité d'Instruction et d'Intervention de la Sécurité Civile no 1 (UIISC 1) - 1st Civil Security Instruction and Intervention Unit (Firefighting unit), in Nogent-le-Rotrou
 Unité d'Instruction et d'Intervention de la Sécurité Civile no 5 (UIISC 5) - 5th Civil Security Instruction and Intervention Unit (Firefighting unit), in Corte
 Unité d'Instruction et d'Intervention de la Sécurité Civile no 7 (UIISC 7) - 7th Civil Security Instruction and Intervention Unit (Firefighting unit), in Brignoles
 25e Régiment du Génie de l'Air (25e RGA) - 25th Air Engineer Regiment (supporting the French Air Force), in Istres, Mont-de-Marsan and Avord
 Délégation aux Réserves de l'Armée de Terre (DRAT) - Army Reserves Delegation, in Paris

Foreign Legion Command 
The Foreign Legion Command manages the Legion related-issues (recruitment, traditions, employment, training, security) and is headquartered in Aubagne.

 Commandement de la Légion étrangère (COM LE) - Foreign Legion Command, in Aubagne
 1 Régiment étranger (1 RE) - 1st Foreign Regiment, in Aubagne
 4 Régiment étranger (4 RE) - 4th Foreign Regiment, in Castelnaudary
 Groupement du recrutement de la Légion étrangère (GRLE) - Foreign Legion Recruiting Group, in Fort de Nogent

Land Forces Command 
The Commandement des forces terrestres (CFT) - Land Forces Command has operational command of the army's combat forces and is headquartered in Lille.

Headquarters Rapid Reaction Corps - France 
 Quartier Général du Corps de Réaction Rapide-France (QG CRR-FR) - Headquarters Rapid Reaction Corps – France (deployable, multi-national Corps Command), in Lille

1st Division 
 1 Division (1re DIV) – 1st Division, in Besançon
 1 Régiment d'Artillerie (1 RA) - 1st Artillery Regiment (M270 MLRS), in Bourogne
 19 Régiment du Génie (19 RG) - 19th Engineer Regiment, in Besançon (one company in Mourmelon-le-Grand, one company in Canjuers)
 132 Régiment d'Infanterie Cynotechnique (132 RIC) - 132nd Military Working Dog Infantry Regiment, in Suippes

7th Armored Brigade 

 7 Brigade Blindée (7 BB) – 7th Armored Brigade, in Besançon
 7 Compagnie de Commandement et de Transmissions (7 CCT) - 7th Command and Signals Company (VAB), in Besançon
 1 Régiment de Chasseurs (1 RCh) - 1st Chasseurs Regiment (Leclerc MBTs, VBL vehicles), in Verdun
 5 Régiment de Dragons (5e RD) - 5th Dragoon Regiment (Leclerc MBTs, VBCI IFVs, VAB Génie, VBL vehicles), in Mailly-le-Camp
 1 Régiment de Tirailleurs (1 RTir) - 1st Tirailleur Regiment (VBCI IFVs), in Epinal
 35 Régiment d'Infanterie (35 RI) - 35th Infantry Regiment (VBCI IFVs), in Belfort 
 152 Régiment d'Infanterie (152 RI) - 152nd Infantry Regiment (VBCI IFVs) in Colmar
 68 Régiment d'Artillerie d'Afrique (68 RAA) - 68th African Artillery Regiment (CAESAR howitzers, RTF1 mortars, Mistral missiles), in Valbonne
 3 Régiment du Génie (3 RG) - 3rd Engineer Regiment (VAB Génie), in Charleville-Mézières
 Centre de Formation Initiale des Militaires du rang 7e Brigade Blindée / 3e Régiment de Chasseurs d'Afrique (CFIM 7e BB - 3e RCA) - 7th Armored Brigade Troops Initial Formation Centre / 3rd African Chasseurs Regiment, in Valdahon

9th Marine Infantry Brigade 

 9 Brigade d'Infanterie de Marine (9e BIMa) - 9th Marine Infantry Brigade, in Poitiers
 9 Compagnie de Commandement et de Transmissions de Marine (9 CCTMa) - 9th Marine Command and Signals Company (VAB), in Poitiers
 Régiment d'Infanterie-Chars de Marine (RICM) - Marine Infantry Tank Régiment (AMX-10 RC, VAB, VBL vehicles), in Poitiers
 1 Régiment d'Infanterie de Marine (1 RIMa) - 1st Marine Infantry Regiment (AMX-10 RC, VAB, VBL vehicles), in Angoulême
 2 Régiment d'Infanterie de Marine (2 RIMa) - 2nd Marine Infantry Regiment (VBCI IFVs), in Champagné
 3 Régiment d'Infanterie de Marine (3 RIMa) - 3rd Marine Infantry Regiment (VBMR Griffon), in Vannes
 126 Régiment d'Infanterie (126 RI) - 126th Infantry Regiment (VAB vehicles, being replaced by VBMR Griffon), in Brive-la-Gaillarde 
 11 Régiment d'Artillerie de Marine (11 RAMa) - 11th Marine Artillery Regiment (CAESAR and TRF1 howitzers, RTF1 mortars, Mistral missiles), in Saint-Aubin-du-Cormier
 6 Régiment du Génie (6 RG) - 6th Engineer Regiment (VAB Génie), in Angers
 Centre de Formation Initiale des Militaires du rang 9 Brigade d'Infanterie de Marine / 1er Régiment d'Artillerie de Marine (CFIM 9e BIMa - 1er RAMa) - 9th Marine Infantry Brigade Troops Initial Formation Centre / 1st Marine Artillery Regiment, in Coëtquidan
 Centre de Formation Initiale des Militaires du rang 9 Brigade d'Infanterie de Marine / 22e Régiment d'Infanterie de Marine (CFIM 9e BIMa - 22e RIMa) - 9th Marine Infantry Brigade Troops Initial Formation Centre / 22nd Marine Infantry Regiment, in Angoulême

27th Mountain Infantry Brigade 

 27 Brigade d’Infanterie de Montagne (27 BIM) – 27th Mountain Infantry Brigade, in Varces
 27 Compagnie de Commandement et de Transmissions de Montagne (27 CCTM) - 27th Mountain Command and Signals Company, in Varces
 4 Régiment de Chasseurs (4 RCh) - 4th Chasseurs Regiment (AMX-10 RC, ERC 90, VAB, VBL vehicles), in Gap
 7 Bataillon de Chasseurs Alpins (7 BCA) - 7th Mountain Infantry Battalion (VAB, VHM vehicles), in Varces
 13 Bataillon de Chasseurs Alpins (13 BCA) - 13th Mountain Infantry Battalion (VBMR Griffon, VHM vehicles), in Barby
 27 Bataillon de Chasseurs Alpins (27 BCA) - 27th Mountain Infantry Battalion (VAB, VHM vehicles), in Cran-Gevrier
 93 Régiment d'Artillerie de Montagne (93 RAM) - 93rd Mountain Artillery Regiment (CAESAR howitzers, RTF1 mortars, Mistral missiles), in Varces
 2 Régiment Étranger de Génie (2 REG) - 2nd Foreign Engineer Regiment, in Saint-Christol
 Centre de Formation Initiale des Militaires du rang 27 Brigade d’Infanterie de Montagne / 6e Bataillon de Chasseurs Alpins (CFIM 27 BIM - 6e BCA) - 27th Mountain Infantry Brigade Troops Initial Formation Centre / 6th Mountain Infantry Battalion, in Gap
 École militaire de haute montagne (EMHM) - High Mountain Military School, in Chamonix
 Groupement Militaire de Haute Montagne (GMHM) - High Mountain Military Group, in Chamonix
 Groupement d'Aguerrissement en Montagne (GAM) - Mountain Acclimatization Grouping, in Modane
 Centre d'Instruction et d'Entraînement au Combat en Montagne (CIECM) - Mountain Combat Instruction and Training Center, in Barcelonnette
 Centre National d'Aguerrissement en Montagne (CNAM) - National Mountain Acclimatization Center, in Briançon

Franco-German Brigade 

Only the French units of the Franco-German Brigade are listed below.

 Brigade Franco-Allemande (BFA) – Franco-German Brigade, in Müllheim (Germany)
 1 Régiment d'Infanterie (1 RI) - 1st Infantry Regiment (VBMR Griffon), in Sarrebourg (France)
 3 Régiment de Hussards (3 RH) - 3rd Hussar Regiment (AMX-10 RC, VAB, VBL vehicles), in Metz (France)
 Bataillon de Commandement et de Soutien (BCS) - Command and Support Battalion, in Müllheim (Germany)

3rd Division 

The 3rd Division carries the traditions of the 3rd Algerian Infantry Division.

 3 Division (3e DIV) – 3rd Division, in Marseille
 2 Régiment de Dragons (2 RD) - 2nd Dragoon Regiment (CBRN-defense Regiment), in Fontevraud-l'Abbaye
 31 Régiment du Génie (31 RG) - 31st Engineer Regiment, in Castelsarrasin
 54 Régiment d'Artillerie (54 RA) - 54th Artillery Regiment (Mistral missiles), in Hyères

2nd Armored Brigade 

 2 Brigade Blindée (2 BB) – 2nd Armored Brigade, in Illkirch-Graffenstaden
 2 Compagnie de Commandement et de Transmissions (2 CCT) - 2nd Command and Signals Company (VAB), in Illkirch-Graffenstaden
 12 Régiment de Cuirassiers (12 RC) - 12th Cuirassier Regiment (Leclerc MBTs, VBL vehicles), in Olivet
 501e Régiment de Chars de Combat (501 RCC) - 501st Tank Regiment (Leclerc MBTs, VAB, VBL vehicles), in Mourmelon-le-Grand
 Régiment de Marche du Tchad (RMT) - Régiment de marche du Tchad (VBCI IFVs), in Meyenheim
 16 Bataillon de Chasseurs à pied (16 BCP) - 16th Chasseurs on Foot Battalion (VBCI IFVs), in Bitche
 92 Régiment d'Infanterie (92 RI) - 92nd Infantry Regiment (VBCI IFVs), in Clermont-Ferrand
 40 Régiment d'Artillerie (40 RA) - 40th Artillery Regiment (AMX AuF1 howitzers (to be replaced by Caesar 8x8), CAESAR howitzers, RTF1 mortars, Mistral missiles), in Suippes 
 13 Régiment du Génie (13 RG) - 13th Engineer Regiment (VAB Génie), in Valdahon
 Centre de Formation Initiale des Militaires du rang de la 2e Brigade Blindée / 12e Régiment de Chasseurs d'Afrique (CFIM 2e BB - 12e RCA) - 2nd Armored Brigade Troops Initial Formation Centre / 12th African Chasseurs Regiment, in Bitche

6th Light Armored Brigade 
 6 Brigade Légère Blindée (6e BLB) – 6th Light Armored Brigade, in Nîmes
 6 Compagnie de Commandement et de Transmissions (6 CCT) - 6th Command and Signals Company (VAB), in Nîmes
 1 Régiment de Spahis (1er RS) – 1st Spahi Regiment (AMX-10 RC, VAB, VBL vehicles), in Valence with AMX 10 RC
 1 Régiment Étranger de Cavalerie (1 REC) - 1st Foreign Cavalry Regiment (AMX-10 RC, VAB, VBL vehicles), in Marseille
 2 Régiment Étranger d'Infanterie (2 REI) - 2nd Foreign Infantry Regiment (VBCI IFVs), in Nîmes
 13 Demi Brigade de Légion Etrangère (13 DBLE) - 13th Demi-Brigade of the Foreign Legion (VAB vehicles, to be replaced by VBMR Griffon), in La Cavalerie
 21 Régiment d'Infanterie de Marine (21 RIMa) - 21st Marine Infantry Regiment (VBMR Griffon), in Fréjus
 3 Régiment d'Artillerie de Marine (3 RAMa) - 3rd Marine Artillery Regiment (CAESAR and TRF1 howitzers, RTF1 mortars, Mistral missiles), in Canjuers
 1 Régiment Étranger de Génie (1 REG) - 1st Foreign Engineer Regiment, in Laudun
 Centre de Formation Initiale des Militaires du rang 6 Brigade Légère Blindée / 4e Régiment d'Infanterie de Marine (CFIM 6e BLB - 4e RIMa) - 6th Light Armored Brigade Troops Initial Formation Centre / 4th Marine Infantry Regiment, in Fréjus

11th Parachute Brigade 

 11 Brigade Parachutiste (11e BP) – 11th Parachute Brigade, in Balma
 11 Compagnie de Commandement et de Transmissions Parachutiste (11 CCTP) - 11th Parachute Command and Signals Company, in Balma
 1 Régiment de Hussards Parachutistes (1 RHP) - 1st Parachute Hussar Regiment (AMX-10 RC, ERC 90, VAB, VBL vehicles), in Tarbes
 1 Régiment de Chasseurs Parachutistes (1 RCP) - 1st Parachute Chasseur Regiment (VAB), in Pamiers
 2 Régiment Étranger de Parachutistes (2 REP) - 2nd Foreign Parachute Regiment (VAB), in Calvi
 3 Régiment de Parachutistes d'Infanterie de Marine (3 RPIMa) - 3rd Marine Infantry Parachute Regiment (VAB, being replaced by VBMR-L Serval), in Carcassonne
 8 Régiment de Parachutistes d'Infanterie de Marine (8 RPIMa) - 8th Marine Infantry Parachute Regiment (VAB), in Castres
 35 Régiment d'Artillerie Parachutiste (35 RAP) - 35th Parachute Artillery Regiment (CAESAR howitzers, RTF1 mortars, Mistral missiles), in Tarbes
 17 Régiment du Génie Parachutiste (17 RGP) - 17th Parachute Engineer Regiment, in Montauban
 1 Régiment du Train Parachutiste (1 RTP) - 1st Parachute Supply Regiment, in Toulouse
 École des Troupes Aéroportées (ETAP) - Airborne Troops School, in Pau
 Centre de Formation Initiale des Militaires du rang 11 Brigade Parachutiste / 6e Régiment de Parachutistes d'Infanterie de Marine (CFIM 11e BP - 6e RPIMa) - 11th Parachute Brigade Troops Initial Formation Centre / 6th Marine Infantry Parachute Regiment, in Caylus

Intelligence Command 

 Commandement du renseignement (COM RENS) - Intelligence Command, in Strasbourg
 44 Régiment de Transmissions (44 RT) - 44th Signal Regiment (Signals Intelligence), in Mutzig
 54 Régiment de Transmissions (54 RT) - 54th Signal Regiment (Electronic Warfare), in Haguenau
785 Compagnie de Guerre Électronique (785 CGE) - 785th Electronic Warfare Company, in Saint-Jacques-de-la-Lande
2 Régiment de Hussards (2 RH) - 2nd Hussar Regiment (VBL vehicles), in Haguenau
 61 Régiment d'Artillerie (61 RA) - 61st Artillery Regiment (Sperwer UAVs, to be replaced in 2020 with Patroller UAVs), in Chaumont
 28 Groupe Géographique (28 GG) - 28th Geographic Group, in Haguenau (battalion size; associated with artillery)
 Centre Interarmées des Actions sur l’Environnement (CIAE) - Interarms Environmental Action Center (PSYOPS), in Lyon
 Centre d'Enseignement et d'Entraînement du renseignement de l'Armée de Terre (CEERAT) - Army Intelligence Teaching and Training Center, in Saumur
 Centre du Renseignement Terre (CRT) - Army Intelligence Center, in Strasbourg
 Centre de Formation Initiale des Militaires du rang du renseignement / 151e Régiment d'Infanterie (CFIM renseignement - 151e RI) - Intelligence Troops Initial Formation Centre / 151st Infantry Regiment, in Verdun

Information and Communication Systems Command 
 Commandement des Systèmes d'Information et de Communication (COM SIC) - Information and Communication Systems Command, in Cesson-Sévigné
 28 Régiment de Transmissions (28 RT) - 28th Signal Regiment, in Issoire
 40 Régiment de Transmissions (40 RT) - 40th Signal Regiment, in Thionville and Hettange-Grande
 41 Régiment de Transmissions (41 RT) - 41st Signal Regiment, in Douai
 48 Régiment de Transmissions (48 RT) - 48th Signal Regiment, in Agen
 53 Régiment de Transmissions (53 RT) - 53rd Signal Regiment, in Lunéville and Chenevières
 807 Compagnie de Transmissions (807 CTrs) - 807th Signal Company (Cyberdefense), in Saint-Jacques-de-la-Lande
 École des transmissions (ETRS) - Signal School, in Cesson-Sévigné
 Centre de Formation Initiale des Militaires du rang des transmissions / 18e Régiment de Transmissions (CFIM transmissions - 18e RT) - Signal Troops Initial Formation Centre / 18th Signal Regiment, in Dieuze

Logistic Command
 
 Commandement de la logistique (COM LOG) - Logistic Command, in Lille and Montlhéry
 Poste de Commandement de Force Logistique (PCFL) - Logistic Force Command Post, in Montlhéry
 14 Régiment d'Infanterie et de Soutien Logistique Parachutiste (14 RISLP) - 14th Infantry and Parachute Logistic Support Regiment, in Toulouse
 121 Régiment du Train (121 RT) - 121st Supply Regiment, in Montlhéry
 503 Régiment du Train (503 RT) - 503rd Supply Regiment, in Nîmes
 511 Régiment du Train (511 RT) - 511th Supply Regiment, in Auxonne
 515 Régiment du Train (515 RT) - 515th Supply Regiment, in Angoulême
 516 Régiment du Train (516 RT) - 516th Supply Regiment, in Toul
 519 Régiment du Train (519 RT) - 519th Maritime Supply Regiment, in Toulon
 Régiment Médical (RMED) - Medical Regiment, in Valbonne
 Bataillon de réserve Île-de-France - 24 Régiment d'Infanterie (24 RI) - Île-de-France Reserve Battalion - 24th Infantry Regiment (Paris vital locations protection unit), in Vincennes and Versailles
 Centre des Transports et Transits de Surface (CTTS) - Surface Transport and Transit Center, in Ollainville
 École du Train et de la Logistique Opérationnelle (ETLO) - Supply and Operational Logistic School, in Bourges
 Centre de Formation Initiale des Militaires du rang de la logistique / 135e Régiment du Train (CFIM logistique - 135e RT) - Logistic Troops Initial Formation Centre / 135th Supply Regiment, in Montlhéry

Training and Interarms Combat Schools Command 
 Commandement de l'Entraînement et des écoles du combat interarmes (COM E2CIA) - Training and Interarms Combat Schools Command, in Mourmelon-le-Grand
 École de l'Infanterie (EI) - Infantry School, in Draguignan
 École du Génie (EG) - Engineering School, in Angers
 École de l'Artillerie (EA) - Artillery School, in Draguignan
 École de cavalerie (EC) - Cavalry School, in Saumur
 Centre Interarmées de la Défense NRBC (CIA NRBC) - Interarms CBRN-defense Center, in Saumur
 Centre National d'Entraînement Commando / 1er Régiment de Choc (CNEC) - National Commando Training Center / 1st Shock Regiment, in Mont-Louis
 Centre d'Entraînement au Combat / 1er Bataillon de Chasseurs à pied (CENTAC) - Combat Training Center / 1st Chasseurs on Foot Battalion, in Mailly-le-Camp
 Centre d'Entraînement des Postes de Commandement / 3e Régiment d'Artillerie (CEPC) - Command Posts Training Center / 3rd Artillery Regiment, in Mailly-le-Camp
 Centre d'Entraînement Interarmes et du Soutien Logistique / 51e Régiment d'Infanterie (CENTIAL) - Interarms and Logistic Support Training Center / 51st Infantry Regiment, in Mourmelon-le-Grand
 Centre d'Entraînement aux actions en Zone Urbaine / 94e Régiment d'Infanterie (CENZUB) - Urban Areas Training Center / 94th Infantry Regiment, in Sissonne
 Centre d'Entraînement de l'Infanterie au tir opérationnel (CEITO) - Infantry Operational Fire Training Center in Canjuers
 1 Régiment de Chasseurs d'Afrique (1 RCA) - 1st African Chasseurs Regiment (Armored Training), in Canjuers
 17 Groupe d'Artillerie (17 GA) - 17th Artillery Group (Air-defense Training), in Biscarrosse

Specialized Overseas and Abroad Staff 
 État-major spécialisé pour l’outre-mer et l’étranger (EMSOME) - Specialized Staff for Overseas and Abroad, in Paris
 2e Régiment de Parachutistes d'Infanterie de Marine (2e RPIMa) - 2nd Marine Infantry Parachute Regiment, in La Réunion
 3e Régiment Étranger d'Infanterie (3e REI) - 3rd Foreign Infantry Regiment, in Kourou (French Guiana)
 5e Régiment de Cuirassiers (5e RC) - 5th Cuirassier Regiment, in Abu Dhabi (United Arab Emirates)
 5e Régiment Interarmes d'Outre-mer (5ee RIAOM) - 5th Overseas Interarms Regiment, in Djibouti City (Djibouti)
 9e Régiment d'Infanterie de Marine (9e RIMa) - 9th Marine Infantry Regiment, in Cayenne (French Guiana)
 33e Régiment d'Infanterie de Marine (33e RIMa) - 33rd Marine Infantry Regiment, in Guadeloupe and Martinique
 Régiment d'Infanterie de Marine du Pacifique - Nouvelle-Calédonie (RIMAP-NC) - Pacific Marine Infantry Regiment - New Caledonia, in Nouméa (New Caledonia)
 Régiment d'Infanterie de Marine du Pacifique - Polynésie (RIMAP-P) - Pacific Marine Infantry Regiment - Polynesia, in Papeete (French Polynesia)
  6th Marine Infantry Battalion (France) - 6e Bataillon d'Infanterie de Marine (6e BIMa) - in Libreville (Gabon)
 43e Bataillon d'Infanterie de Marine (43e BIMa) - 43rd Marine Infantry Battalion, in Port-Bouët (Ivory Coast)
 Détachement de Légion Étrangère de Mayotte (DLEM) - Mayotte Foreign Legion Detachment, in Mayotte

DC SIMMT 
 Direction Centrale de la Structure Intégrée du Maintien en condition opérationnelle des Matériels Terrestres (DC SIMMT) - Central Directorate of the Integrated Structure for the Maintenance of Terrestrial Materiel in Operational Condition, in Versailles

Maintenance Command 
 Commandement de la Maintenance des Forces (COM MF) - Maintenance Command, in Lille and Versailles
 2 Régiment du Matériel (2 RMAT) - 2nd Materiel Regiment, in Bruz, Poitiers and Saint-Jacques-de-la-Lande
 3 Régiment du Matériel (3 RMAT) - 3rd Materiel Regiment (Parachute capable), in Muret, Montauban and Vayres
 4 Régiment du Matériel (4 RMAT) - 4th Materiel Regiment, in Nimes, Canjuers, Draguignan and Miramas
 6 Régiment du Matériel (6 RMAT) - 6th Materiel Regiment, in Besançon, Gresswiller and Woippy
 7 Régiment du Matériel (7 RMAT) - 7th Materiel Regiment, in Lyon and Varces
 8 Régiment du Matériel (8 RMAT) - 8th Materiel Regiment, in Mourmelon and Satory
 École du Matériel (ECOMAT) - Maintenance School, in Bourges
 Centre de Formation Initiale des Militaires du rang du matériel / 1er Régiment du Matériel (CFIM matériel - 1er RMAT) - Materiel Troops Initial Formation Centre / 1st Materiel Regiment, in Garrigues

Industrial Maintenance Service 

 Service de la Maintenance Industrielle Terrestre (SMITer) - Industrial Maintenance Service, in Versailles
 12 Base de Soutien du Matériel (12 BSMAT) - 12th Materiel Support Base, in Neuvy-Pailloux, Douai and Gien
 13 Base de Soutien du Matériel (13 BSMAT) - 13th Materiel Support Base, in Clermont-Ferrand, Moulins, Saint-Astier and Tulle
 14 Base de Soutien du Matériel (14 BSMAT) - 14th Materiel Support Base, in Nouâtre, Bruz and Poitiers

Army Human Resources Directorate 
 Direction des Ressources Humaines de l'Armée de terre (DRHAT) - Army Human Resources Directorate, in Tours

Human Resources and Formation Command 
 Commandement des Ressources Humaines et de la Formation (COM RH-FORM) - Human Resources and Formation Command, in Tours
 Écoles militaires de Saint-Cyr Coëtquidan - Saint-Cyr Coëtquidan Military Schools, in Coëtquidan
 École Spéciale Militaire de Saint-Cyr (ESM) - Saint-Cyr Special Military School of, in Coëtquidan
 École Militaire Interarmes (EMIA) - Interarms Military School, in Coëtquidan
 École d'Administration Militaire (EAM) - Military Administration School, in Coëtquidan
 4e Bataillon de l'École Spéciale Militaire de Saint-Cyr - 4th Battalion, Saint-Cyr Special Military School, in Coëtquidan
 Ecole Nationale des Sous-officiers d'active (ENSOA) - National Active Non-Commissioned Officers School, in Saint-Maixent-l'École
 Lycées de la Défense - Terre - Army High-schools
 Prytanée National Militaire, in La Flèche
 Lycée militaire de Saint-Cyr, in Versailles
 Lycée militaire d'Aix-en-Provence, in Aix-en-Provence
 Lycée militaire d'Autun, in Autun
 Centre Expert Ressources Humaines et Solde - Human Resources and Salary Center, in Nancy
 Groupement de Recrutement et de Sélection Île-de-France / 8e Bataillon de Chasseurs (GRS ID - 8e BC) - Recruiting Group / 8th Chasseurs Regiment, in Paris
 Groupement de Recrutement et de Sélection Nord-Est / 8th Régiment d'Artillerie (GRS NE - 8e RA) - Recruiting Group / 8th Artillery Regiment, in Vandœuvre-lès-Nancy
 Groupement de Recrutement et de Sélection Nord-Ouest / 41e Régiment d'Infanterie (GRS NO - 41e RI) - Recruiting Group / 41st Infantry Regiment, in Saint-Jacques-de-la-Lande
 Groupement de Recrutement et de Sélection Sud-Est / 99e Régiment d'Infanterie (GRS SE - 99e RI) - Recruiting Group / 99th Infantry Regiment, in Lyon
 Groupement de Recrutement et de Sélection Sud-Ouest / 7e Régiment d'Infanterie de Marine (GRS SO - 7e RIMa) - Recruiting Group / 7th Marine Infantry Regiment, in Bordeaux

Territorial Zones Command 
France is divided into six Defense and Security zones, which provide territorial services to military and civil authorities in their area.

 Commandement Territorial de Niveau Zonal (COM ZT) - Territorial Zones Command, in Paris 
 Île-de-France Zone, in Saint-Germain-en-Laye
 North-East Zone (covering Hauts-de-France, Grand Est), in Metz
 North-West Zone (covering Pays de la Loire, Brittany, Normandy, Centre-Val de Loire), in Rennes
 South-West Zone (covering Nouvelle-Aquitaine), in Bordeaux
 South Zone (covering Occitanie, Provence-Alpes-Côte d'Azur, Corsica), in Marseille
 South-East Zone (covering Auvergne-Rhône-Alpes, Bourgogne-Franche-Comté), in Lyon

Geographic Distribution 
{{Location map+ | France
| width = 1020
| float = center
| caption = {{center|French Army brigade units 2020:}}
| relief = 1
| places =

}}

FootnotesNotesCitations'''

French Army
French Army